Yuri Honing (born 6 July 1965) is a Dutch jazz saxophonist.

Career
In 2001, Honing met Paul Bley and recorded the album Seven with Bley on piano, Gary Peacock on bass and Paul Motian on drums. This album garnered Honing the Dutch Edison Award in 2002. In The Penguin Guide to Jazz Recordings (Eighth Edition) this CD was recognized with four (out of five) stars.

For a few years Honing organised a special concert named Winterreise in Paradiso (Amsterdam). In December 2015 they did their final show.

After the success of the Yuri Honing Wired Paradise, which was characterised by their rock influence and electric guitars, Honing founded the Yuri Honing Acoustic Quartet in 2012. In 2016 they won the Edison award for 'Best Instrumental Jazz Album' for their second CD Desire (2015). Their third album Goldbrun (2018) proceeded to win this award as well, making it his third Edison in total.

Discography

As leader

References

External links 

 Biography of Yuri Honing on the Dutch Music Encyclopedia

Dutch jazz saxophonists
Male saxophonists
1965 births
Living people
Musicians from Amsterdam
21st-century saxophonists
21st-century male musicians
Male jazz musicians